Soo-geun, also spelled Swoo-geun, is a Korean masculine given name. Its meaning differs based on the hanja used to write each syllable of the name. There are 34 hanja with the reading "soo" and 18 hanja with the reading "geun" on the South Korean government's official list of hanja which may be registered for use in given names.

People with this name include:
Park Su-geun (1914–1965), South Korean painter
Kim Swoo-geun (1931–1986), South Korean architect
Lee Soo-geun (born 1975), South Korean comedian
Jung Soo-keun (born 1977), South Korean baseball player

See also
List of Korean given names

References

Korean masculine given names